Albert Manteca Buldo (born 10 June 1988) is a Spanish footballer who plays as a forward.

Club career
Born in Begues, Barcelona, Catalonia, Manteca joined FC Barcelona's youth setup in 2006, aged 18, after playing for CF Damm and UE Castelldefels. He made his senior debuts with Burgos CF's reserves in the 2007–08 campaign, in the lower leagues.

Manteca was promoted to the latter's main squad in the 2008 summer, but was subsequently released and went on a trial at Club Atlético Lanús in November. However, nothing came of it and he started training with Segunda División B's CF Gavà in March 2009, signing a contract in July.

In 2010 Manteca joined Hamilton Academical F.C. in a trial basis, but signed for UE Sant Andreu also in the third level. In July of the following year he moved to fellow league team Celta de Vigo B.

On 29 January 2013 Manteca moved abroad for the first time in his career, joining Austrian Football First League club SKN St. Pölten. He played his first match as a professional on 8 March, coming on as a second half substitute for Mirnel Sadović in a 1–2 away loss against SC Rheindorf Altach.

In February 2014 Manteca switched teams and countries again, joining Thai Premier League's Sisaket F.C. He made his debut for the club on 22 March, against TOT S.C., and appeared in five matches during the season.

On 30 January 2015 Manteca returned to Sant Andreu, signing a six-month contract.

References

External links
 
 

1988 births
Living people
People from Baix Llobregat
Sportspeople from the Province of Barcelona
Spanish footballers
Footballers from Catalonia
Association football forwards
Segunda División B players
CF Gavà players
UE Sant Andreu footballers
SKN St. Pölten players
Albert Manteca
Albert Manteca
Spanish expatriate footballers
Spanish expatriate sportspeople in Austria
Expatriate footballers in Austria
Spanish expatriate sportspeople in Thailand
Expatriate footballers in Thailand
CF Damm players